The Best of Bud Powell on Verve is a selection of jazz pianist Bud Powell's recordings for Verve Records, released on August 23, 1994.

The similarly-titled The Best of Bud Powell was released by Blue Note Records in 1989, and features tracks recorded from 1949-1963 on that label, with little overlap in song selection.

Track listing 
All songs were written by Bud Powell, except where noted.
 "Lady Bird" (Tadd Dameron) – 4:44
 "Dance of the Infidels" – 2:16
 "So Sorry, Please" – 3:14
 "Sweet Georgia Brown" (Maceo Pinkard, Kenneth Casey) – 2:48
 "Willow Grove" (aka "Willow Groove") – 4:27
 "Tempus Fugue-it" (aka "Tempus Fugit") – 2:25
 "It Never Entered My Mind" (Richard Rodgers, Lorenz Hart) – 2:56
 "Bean and the Boys" (Contrafact of "Lover Come Back to Me") (Coleman Hawkins) – 3:38
 "Celia" – 2:57
 "Tea for Two" [78 take (take 10)] (Vincent Youmans, Irving Caesar) – 3:46
 "Star Eyes" (Gene De Paul, Don Raye) – 3:28
 "April in Paris" (Vernon Duke, E.Y. "Yip" Harburg) – 3:08
 "Tenderly" (Walter Gross, Jack Lawrence) – 3:15
 "All God's Chillun Got Rhythm" (Bronislaw Kaper, Gus Kahn, Walter Jurmann) – 2:59
 "Stairway to the Stars" (Matty Malneck, Frank Signorelli, Mitchell Parish) – 4:58
 "Just One of Those Things" (Cole Porter) – 3:50
 "Parisian Thoroughfare" (aka "Parisienne Thorofare") – 2:28

Personnel

Performance 
Bud Powell plays piano on all tracks.

April 27, 1955, tracks 1, 11, 15. April 25, 1955, track 5.
 George Duvivier – bass
 Art Taylor – drums
January 13, 1955, track 2.
 Percy Heath – bass
 Kenny Clarke – drums
February 1950, tracks 3, 4, 12.
 Curly Russell – bass
 Max Roach – drums
February 23, 1949, tracks 6, 10, 14.
 Ray Brown – bass
 Max Roach – drums
June 4, 1954, track 7.
 Percy Heath – bass
 Art Taylor – drums
January 11, 1955, tracks 8, 13.
 Lloyd Trotman – bass
 Art Blakey – drums
July 1, 1950, track 9.
 Ray Brown – bass
 Buddy Rich – drums
February, 1951, tracks 16-17 – Powell solos.

Production 
 Norman Granz – producer
 Max Harrison – liner notes
 Leroy Lovett – producer

References 

1994 greatest hits albums
Bud Powell compilation albums
Verve Records compilation albums